Liquorice (British English) or licorice (American English) is the common name of Glycyrrhiza glabra, a flowering plant of the bean family Fabaceae, from the root of which a sweet, aromatic flavouring can be extracted.

The liquorice plant is an herbaceous perennial legume native to Western Asia, North Africa, and Southern Europe. Botanically, it is not closely related to anise or fennel, which are sources of similar flavouring compounds. (Another such source, star anise, is even more distantly related from anise and fennel than liquorice, despite its similar common name.) Liquorice is used as a flavouring in candies and tobacco, particularly in some European and West Asian countries.

Liquorice extracts have been used in herbalism and traditional medicine. In at least one case, death has been attributed to excessive liquorice consumption.

Etymology 
The word liquorice, or licorice, is derived via the Anglo-French , from Late Latin , itself ultimately derived from Greek  (the Modern Greek spelling of the genus is ) literally meaning 'sweet root' and referring to Glycyrrhiza glabra.

The Late Latin form is a corruption of the older form , as attested in Pliny's latinization of the Greek.

, its English common name is spelled 'liquorice' in most of the Commonwealth, but 'licorice' in the United States.

Description 
The roots are stoloniferous.

Chemistry 

The scent of liquorice root comes from a complex and variable combination of compounds, of which anethole is up to 3% of total volatiles. Much of the sweetness in liquorice comes from glycyrrhizin, which has 30–50 times the sweetness of sugar. The sweetness is different from sugar, being less instant, tart, and lasting longer.

The isoflavene glabrene and the isoflavane glabridin, found in the roots of liquorice, are phytoestrogens.

Cultivation and uses 
Liquorice grows best in well-drained soils in deep valleys with full sun. It is harvested in the autumn two to three years after planting.  Countries producing liquorice include India, Iran, Italy, Afghanistan, China, Pakistan ( in Urdu), Iraq, Azerbaijan, Uzbekistan, Turkmenistan and Turkey. In India, liquorice is called  in the region of Maharashtra.

In 2019, the world market for liquorice extract was 191 million, with the largest exporters led by France, Uzbekistan, China, and Iran, each providing 10–14% of the total.

Tobacco

Liquorice is used as a flavouring agent for tobacco, for flavour-enhancing and moistening agents in the manufacture of American blend cigarettes, moist snuff, chewing tobacco, and pipe tobacco. Liquorice provides tobacco products with a natural sweetness and a distinctive flavour that blends readily with the natural and imitation flavouring components employed in the tobacco industry. Liquorice can also be added to cigarette rolling papers. , the US Food and Drug Administration banned the use of any "characterizing flavors" other than menthol from cigarettes, but not other manufactured tobacco products.

Food and confectionery

Liquorice flavour is found in a wide variety of candies or sweets. In most of these candies, the taste is reinforced by aniseed oil so the actual content of liquorice is very low. Liquorice confections are primarily purchased by consumers in Europe, but are also popular in other countries such as Australia and New Zealand.

In the Netherlands, liquorice confectionery (drop) is one of the most popular forms of sweets. It is sold in many forms. Mixing it with mint, menthol, aniseed, or laurel is quite popular. Mixing it with ammonium chloride is also popular as it is in Finland. Strong, salty sweets are also popular in Nordic countries where liquorice flavoured alcohols are also popular, particularly in Denmark and Finland.

Dried sticks of the liquorice root are also a traditional confectionery in their own right in the Netherlands as were they once in Britain although their popularity has waned in recent decades. Through chewing and suckling, the intensely sweet flavour is released. The sweetness is 30 to 50 times as strong as sucrose, without causing damage to teeth. Since about the 1970s,  has become rarer and been replaced by easier to consume candies (including 'drop').

Pontefract in Yorkshire, England, is where liquorice mixed with sugar began to be used as a sweet in the contemporary way. Pontefract cakes were originally made there. In Cumbria, County Durham, Yorkshire and Lancashire, it is colloquially known as 'Spanish', supposedly because Spanish monks grew liquorice root at Rievaulx Abbey near Thirsk.

In Italy, Spain and France, liquorice is popular in its natural form. The root of the plant is simply dug up, washed, dried, and chewed as a mouth freshener. Throughout Italy, unsweetened liquorice is consumed in the form of small black pieces made only from 100% pure liquorice extract. In Calabria a popular liqueur is made from pure liquorice extract and in Reggio Emilia a famous soft drink is made with name acqua d'orcio. Liquorice is used in Syria and Egypt, and only in Diyarbakır in Turkey, where it is sold as a drink, in shops as well as street vendors.

Research

Properties of glycyrrhizin are under preliminary research, such as for hepatitis C or topical treatment of psoriasis, but the low quality of studies  prevents conclusions about efficacy and safety.

Traditional medicine
Liquorice has been used in Ayurveda in the belief it may treat various diseases, although there is no high-quality clinical research to indicate it is safe or effective for any medicinal purpose. The European Medical Agency added liquorice to their list of herbal medicine.

Toxicity
The major dose-limiting toxicities of liquorice are corticosteroid in nature, because of the inhibitory effect that its chief active constituents, glycyrrhizin and enoxolone, have on cortisol degradation, and include edema, hypokalaemia, weight gain or loss, and hypertension.

The United States Food and Drug Administration believes that foods containing liquorice and its derivatives (including glycyrrhizin) are safe if not consumed excessively. Liquorice should not be eaten or used during pregnancy.

Fungicide
The essential oils inhibit the growth of Aspergillus flavus.

Liquorice poisoning

Liquorice is an extract from the Glycyrrhiza glabra plant which contains glycyrrhizic acid (GZA). GZA molecules are composed of one molecule of glycyrrhetinic acid and two molecules of glucuronic acid.

The extracts from the root of the plant can be referred to as liquorice, sweet root, and glycyrrhiza extract. G. glabra grows in Europe and Western Asia. When administered orally, the product of glycyrrhetinic acid is found in human urine whereas GZA is not. This shows that glycyrrhetic acid is absorbed and metabolized in the intestines in humans. GZA is hydrolyzed to glycyrrhetic acid in the intestines by bacteria.

For thousands of years, G. glabra has been used for medicinal purposes including indigestion and stomach inflammation. Some other medicinal uses are cough suppression, ulcer treatment, and as a laxative. Salts of GZA can also be used in many products as sweeteners and aromatizers. The major (roughly 90%) use of liquorice is in the tobacco industry. The rest is split evenly between food and pharmaceutics, at 5% of usage each. Liquorice extract is often found in many sweets and candies, some drugs, and beverages like root beer. It can also be used in chewing gum, tobacco products like snuff, and toothpaste.

A high intake of liquorice can have many toxic effects. Hyper-mineralocorticosteroid syndrome can occur when the body retains sodium, loses potassium altering biochemical and hormonal activities. Some of these activities include lower aldosterone level, decline of the renin-angiotensin system and increased levels of the atrial natriuretic hormone in order to compensate the variations in homoeostasis.

Some other symptoms of toxicity include electrolyte imbalance, edema, increased blood pressure, weight gain, heart problems, and weakness. Symptoms depend on the severity of toxicity. Some other complaints include fatigue, shortness of breath, kidney failure, and paralysis. In 2020, physicians reported a case of a man who died of cardiac arrest as a result of drastically low potassium levels. He had been eating a bag of black licorice a day for three weeks previously.
 
Most adverse effects of liquorice poisoning are attributed to the mineralocorticoid effects of GZA. Depending on the dose and intake of liquorice, serious problems and even hospitalization can occur. People with previously existing heart or kidney problems may be more susceptible to GZA and liquorice poisoning. It is important to monitor the amount of liquorice consumed in order to prevent toxicity. It is difficult to determine a safe level, because the effects are affected by a variety of factors and vary from person to person. In the most sensitive individuals, daily intake of about  GZA can cause problems. This is equivalent to  liquorice sweets. However, most people can consume up to  before experiencing symptoms, which would be about  liquorice sweets. A rule of thumb is that a normal healthy person can consume  GZA a day.

Gallery

References

External links

 
 Glycyrrhiza glabra (licorice), Kew plant profile
 What's That Stuff?: Licorice, Chemical & Engineering News

 
11β-Hydroxysteroid dehydrogenase inhibitors
Glycyrrhiza
Spices
Medicinal plants
Plants used in traditional Chinese medicine
Monoamine oxidase inhibitors
Demulcents
Plants used in Ayurveda
Plants described in 1753
Indian spices